Jan Kilian is the name of:

Jan Kilian (pastor), Prussian-American pastor
Jan Kilian (politician), Polish politician